Arnold Yarrow (born 17 April 1920) is a British retired actor, screenwriter and novelist who is best known for his brief role as Jewish bricklayer Benny Bloom in TV soap opera EastEnders.

In addition, he is known to Doctor Who fans for his portrayal as diminutive Exxilon leader Bellal in the 1974 serial Death to the Daleks. Following the death of Earl Cameron in July 2020, Yarrow became the oldest living actor to have appeared in Doctor Who. He had previously become the fourth (credited) performer associated with the franchise to become a centenarian after Zohra Sehgal, Olaf Pooley and Cameron.

Other TV appearances include roles in Crane, Ghost Squad, Coronation Street, Dr. Finlay's Casebook, The Onedin Line and London's Burning as well as a part in the 1993 film Son of the Pink Panther.

His scriptwriting work includes episodes of Crown Court, Warship, Softly, Softly: Task Force and EastEnders. As well as this, Yarrow has written numerous books such as TV tie-ins like Softly Softly Casebook and Softly Softly Murder Casebook as well as his own novels Death is a Z and The Grease-Paint Monkey.

Yarrow, a Jew, turned 100 in April 2020. He lives in Herne Bay, Kent.

References

External links 
 
 Arnold Yarrow at Theatricalia
 HAPPY 100TH BIRTHDAY ARNOLD YARROW - Interviewed by Toby Hadoke

1920 births
Living people
20th-century English male actors
English male television actors
English male film actors
English screenwriters
English centenarians
Men centenarians
Royal Shakespeare Company members
Jewish English male actors
English Jews